Rama Shrine is a -elevation platform-summit located in the eastern Grand Canyon, in Coconino County of northern Arizona, United States. The Shrine is named for Rama, the Hindu god of chivalry and virtue. The landform is attached at the southeast to the Vishnu Temple massif, about  distant. A twin landform occupies the southwest of Vishnu Temple, the Krishna Shrine. Drainages to the Colorado are east and southeast; between the two Shrines, is the south Asbestos Canyon drainage.The Rama Shrine prominence is a rectangular platform of the Supai Group (unit 4 of 4), the cliff-former (and platform-former), hard Esplanade Sandstone. Remainder debris of very-shallow slopes of burnt-red Hermit Shale (a slope-former) cover the horizontal platform.

Geology

The geology of Rama Shrine is basically identical to its Vishnu Temple neighbor; on Vishnu Temple, the slopes of dark burnt-red Hermit Shale (a slope-former), are large and visible. The debris-remainder on the Rama Shrine platform is of similar color, and is composed of Hermit Shale debris-remainder, upon hard Esplanade Sandstone (unit 4, Supai), and the debris is dark-burnt-red, and discontinuous in its depth.

Beneath the Supai Group, is the platform and cliff of Redwall Limestone, and below, the three Cambrian units.

When Rama Shrine is viewed from the southeast, (from the South Rim), it overlooks the northwest side of the Colorado River, and a wide expanse of hills and valleys of the colorful Dox Formation, (Mesoproterozoic). The southeast flank of Rama Shrine can be seen down to the Tapeats Sandstone, (the Great Unconformity). (The 1,000 million-year time erosion, and the ancient rock layers below.)

See also
 Krishna Shrine
 Sheba Temple
 Solomon Temple

References

External links

 Aerial view-(platform with rock debris); Rama Shrine, Mountainzone

Grand Canyon
Grand Canyon National Park
Colorado Plateau
Landforms of Coconino County, Arizona
Mountains of Arizona
Mountains of Coconino County, Arizona
North American 1000 m summits